Wickwar is a surname. Notable people with the surname include:

 A. J. Wickwar, 15th Surveyor General of Ceylon
 Len Wickwar (1911–1980), British boxer

English-language surnames